Luigi Longo (15 March 1900 – 16 October 1980), also known as Gallo, was an Italian communist politician and general secretary of the Italian Communist Party from 1964 to 1972. He was also the first foreigner to be awarded an Order of Lenin.

Early life
Longo was born in Fubine, in the province of Alessandria, Piedmont. As a student at the Politecnico di Torino, he became active in the youth wing of the Italian Socialist Party (PSI), and engaged in political propaganda from a Marxist perspective. He was a regular visitor to the offices of L'Ordine Nuovo, the newspaper founded by Antonio Gramsci, and became acquainted with Gramsci and Palmiro Togliatti. In 1921, at the Livorno Congress of the PSI, he was one of the instigators of the split in the party, when supporters of Vladimir Lenin's Bolshevik line left to form the Italian Communist Party (PCI). He became a leading figure in the new PCI along with Togliatti, Gramsci and others.

Longo was a fervent anti-fascist, and, when Benito Mussolini established his Fascist regime in Italy in 1922, he emigrated to France where he became one of the principal leaders of the PCI. In the same year he was a member of a delegation to the Comintern Congress in Moscow, where he met Lenin. He would return to Moscow several times in the years to come, with a specific expertise in political ideology, and was to meet Joseph Stalin and other members of the Soviet Union leadership. In 1933 he became a member of the Comintern's political commission. In 1934 he signed a joint action agreement between the PCI and the PSI.

Spanish Civil War and Resistance
Longo took part in the Spanish Civil War as an inspector of the Republican troops in the International Brigades under the leadership of Randolfo Pacciardi, and took the nom de guerre Gallo. After the defeat of the Second Spanish Republic by General Franco, he returned to France.

Following the 1940 invasion of France, the Vichy-based collaborationist government was established under Philippe Pétain. Longo was arrested and detained in an internment camp at Vernet from 1939 to 1941. There he made the acquaintance of Leo Valiani, among other left-wing radicals. In 1941 he was handed over to the Italian fascist authorities and interned at Ventotene. When Mussolini fell from power on 25 July 1943, Longo was released. After Mussolini regained control of Northern Italy (which he led as the Italian Social Republic), Longo took command of the Garibaldi Brigades, the communist forces in the Italian partisan resistance. Longo became deputy commander of the Gruppo volontari per la liberta ("Group of Volunteers for Freedom"), and a close collaborator of Ferruccio Parri; in April 1945 Longo was one of the leading figures of the uprising in northern Italy. It was at Dongo on Lake Como on 28 April 1945 and whilst being escorted by the Garibaldi Brigade partisans that Mussolini and his mistress Claretta Petacci were executed; the extent to which Longo took part in the killings has been the subject of dispute by historians.

Post-war
After the war he was a member of the National Congress and in 1946 was elected to the Constituent Assembly. Also in 1946, Teresa Mattei chose the mimosa as the symbol of International Women's Day at the request of Longo. He was subsequently elected, and repeatedly re-elected, to the Italian Chamber of Deputies on the PCI list and was a member of the party leadership. In 1964, after the death of Palmiro Togliatti, he became secretary of the PCI, declaring that he was "a secretary, not a boss". In this role, he continued Togliatti's line, known as the "Italian road to Socialism", playing down the alliance between the Italian Communist Party and the Soviet Union. He reacted without hostility to the new left movements that sprang up in 1968 and, among the leaders of the PCI, was one of those most disposed to engage with the new activists, although he did not condone their excesses.

In late 1968 Longo suffered a stroke; although he partially recovered in the subsequent months, from February 1969 he was assisted in most decisions by Enrico Berlinguer acting as vice-secretary. In 1972 Longo resigned the position of party secretary, supporting the choice of Berlinguer as his successor. From that year until his death, eight years later in Rome, he was honorary president of the PCI. In that capacity, he expressed his opposition to the "national solidarity" line the PCI was later to espouse.

Longo was also a prolific writer. He was the founder of Vie Nuove, a popular magazine of the Communist Party.

References

Sources

1900 births
1980 deaths
People from the Province of Alessandria
Italian Socialist Party politicians
Italian Communist Party politicians
Members of the National Council (Italy)
Members of the Constituent Assembly of Italy
Deputies of Legislature I of Italy
Deputies of Legislature II of Italy
Deputies of Legislature III of Italy
Deputies of Legislature IV of Italy
Deputies of Legislature V of Italy
Deputies of Legislature VI of Italy
Deputies of Legislature VII of Italy
Deputies of Legislature VIII of Italy
Politicians of Piedmont
Italian people of the Spanish Civil War
International Brigades personnel
Italian resistance movement members
Recipients of the Order of the People's Hero
Exiled Italian politicians
Italian magazine founders